Neofidia humeralis is a species of leaf beetle. It ranges from southeastern Arizona and southwestern New Mexico, along the Sierra Madre Occidental and Sierra Madre del Sur, south to Oaxaca in southwestern Mexico. It was first described as two species, Fidia humeralis and Fidia plagiata, by the French entomologist Édouard Lefèvre in 1877. These two species were later found to be synonymous.

References

Further reading

 

Eumolpinae
Articles created by Qbugbot
Beetles described in 1877
Taxa named by Édouard Lefèvre
Beetles of North America